Aleksandr Alekseyevich Sharov (born 9 March 1981) is a former Russian professional football player.

Club career
He played in the Russian Football National League for FC Nizhny Novgorod in the 2011–12 season.

References

External links
 

1981 births
Sportspeople from Vladivostok
Living people
Russian footballers
Association football midfielders
FC Khimik Dzerzhinsk players
FC Lokomotiv Nizhny Novgorod players
FC Znamya Truda Orekhovo-Zuyevo players
FC Sheksna Cherepovets players
FC Nizhny Novgorod (2007) players
FC Sever Murmansk players